Parliamentary elections were held in Iraq on 10 October 2021. The elections decide the 329 members of the Council of Representatives who will in turn elect the Iraqi president and confirm the prime minister. 25 million voters are eligible to take part in Iraq's fifth parliamentary election since the 2003 US-led invasion and the first since the 2019 Iraqi October Revolution. The election result led to the 2021 Baghdad clashes.

Background
The elections were originally due to be held in 2022 but were brought forward to June 2021 due to the 2019–2021 Iraqi protests. They were delayed until October as the Independent High Electoral Commission asked for more time to organize "free and fair elections", which the cabinet of Iraq approved on 19 January 2021.

Electoral system 
The electoral system was changed following the last parliamentary elections amid the 2019–2021 Iraqi protests. Previously conducted under proportional representation calculated using the Webster/Sainte-Laguë method with the governorates as constituencies, the 2021 elections were conducted under single non-transferable vote in 83 multi-member constituencies. One-quarter of total seats are reserved for women in the constituencies, while nine are reserved for minorities (5 for Christians and 1 each for Yazidis, Shabaks, Mandaeans and Feyli Kurds).

Boycott threats
On 15 July 2021, Muqtada al-Sadr announced the Sadrist Movement intended to boycott the October 10th election, citing corruption and voter fraud and claiming that free and fair elections were impossible in the wake of the ongoing political crisis. On 24 July, the Iraqi Communist Party (which ran with the Sadrist Movement as the Alliance Towards Reforms in 2018), announced they were boycotting the elections, stating "In the absence of conditions for free and fair elections, participation in them would only mean collusion in reproducing the same corrupt political system that is responsible for the catastrophic state of affairs in the country." Louis Raphaël I Sako, Patriarch of the Chaldean Catholic Church, also called on Christians to boycott the election.

The boycotts have been condemned by the United Nations Assistance Mission for Iraq, as well as by other Iraqi political parties and leaders, including former Prime Minister Nouri al-Maliki, leader of the State of Law Coalition, and the Kurdistan Democratic Party.

On 27 August, al-Sadr reversed his decision to boycott and announced his party would take part in the election.

On 9 October, Kurdistan Socialist Democratic Party announced that they would withdraw their candidates from the elections in Dohuk, Erbil and Sulaymaniyah governorates (10 constituencies) and declared their support for the Kurdistan Democratic Party.

Voter turnout by province 
Iraq's Independent High Electoral Commission initially published a national voter turnout of 42.15%, with 8,818,210 voters out of an electorate of 20,919,844. The Commission later updated these results to show a slightly lower turnout of 41.05%, based on 9,077,779 voters out of 22,116,368 eligible.

Results
Soldiers, prisoners and displaced people voted early on 8 October.

The polls were held on 10 October. On 27 December, the Iraqi Supreme Court ratified the parliamentary election results after rejecting a complaint of irregularities filed by the pro-Iran Hashed al-Shaabi former paramilitary alliance. The High Electoral Commission announced partial preliminary results on 11 October. The Sadrist political bloc received the most seats after the initial count, with 73. The political Fatah (Conquest) Alliance, the political arm of the pro-Iran Hashed, won 17 seats, down from the 48 it had won in the prior election. Hashed leaders rejected the results, alleging "fraud" in the elections. They took their case to court seeking "to have the results annulled" because of "serious violations". On 12 October, the commission announced a manual count of polling stations that were not electronically counted in the initial canvass. Of the total 57,944 polling stations, 45,716 uploaded electronic results. 8,547 stations were selected by lottery to be manually counted, while the remaining 3,681 stations experienced technical difficulties necessitating a manual count as well. This manual count is expected to modify the overall allocation of seats.

On 15 October, the commission noted it had received 356 complaints about the preliminary election count by the 14 October deadline. The complaints division must address the complaints within seven days, which may then be reviewed by the judiciary within ten days. Final results will not be released until the complaints are resolved.

Late on 16 October, the commission announced its updated preliminary results after completion of manual recounts. The updated results triggered another opportunity to file election complaints with a deadline of 19 October. The commission had received over 1,000 complaints by 18 October, but a spokesperson stated it was unlikely the appeals will change the outcome.

Official final results, after recounting by The High Electoral Commission were shared on November 30.

The Kurdistan Democratic Party, which ran independently rather than as part of a multi-party coalition list, won an updated preliminary total of 33 seats, making it Iraq's single largest political party.

The Alliance Towards Reforms won 73 seats, with the Progress Party winning 37, the State of Law Coalition winning 34, the Kurdistan Democratic Party with 32, the Fatah Alliance winning 17 seats, the Patriotic Union of Kurdistan gaining 16 seats, the Azem Alliance with 12 seats, while the Emtidad Movement and the New Generation Movement received nine seats each, and political independents gained 40 seats.

As for the seats reserved for minorities, the Babylon Movement won 4 seats out of 5 reserved for Christians, while 1 seat was gained by an independent candidate. The Yazidi single seat was won by the Yazidi Movement for Reform and Progress. Likewise, one seat each reserved for the Yezidi and Shabak communities were won by Nayef Khalaf Sido of the Yezidi Progress Party, and independent candidate Waad Mahmoud Ahmed respectively.

By governorate

Baghdad Governorate

Anbar Governorate

Babil Governorate

Basrah Governorate

Dhi Qar Governorate

Diyala Governorate

Dohuk Governorate

Erbil Governorate

Karbala Governorate

Kirkuk Governorate

Maysan Governorate

Muthanna Governorate

Najaf Governorate

Nineveh Governorate

Al Qadisiyyah Governorate

Saladin Governorate

Sulaymaniyah Governorate 
These results include Halabja Governorate.

Wasit Governorate

Maps

Aftermath

Conduct 
The United Nations Security Council issued a statement congratulating the people and Government of Iraq on the smooth conduct of a “technically sound election” and deploring related threats of violence. Jeanine Hennis-Plasschaert, Special Representative of United Nations, said the vote was generally peaceful and well-run. She added that “there is much for Iraqis to be proud of in this election.” She acknowledged that elections and their outcomes can provoke strong feelings, in Iraq or in any democracy across the globe and called for all groups to accept the outcome of the electoral process.

Notes

References

Iraq
Parliamentary election
2020s elections in Iraq
Elections in Iraq
Iraq
Election and referendum articles with incomplete results